Priyamulla Sophia is a 1975 Indian Malayalam-language film, directed by A. Vincent. The film stars Prem Nazir, KPAC Lalitha, Prema and Janardanan. The film's score was composed by G. Devarajan.

Cast
 
Prem Nazir 
KPAC Lalitha 
Prema 
Janardanan 
KPAC Sunny 
Meena 
Priyamalini
Reena 
Vincent 
Adam Ayub (Actor)

Soundtrack
The music was composed by G. Devarajan with lyrics by Vayalar.

References

External links
 

1975 films
1970s Malayalam-language films
Films directed by A. Vincent